Ialoveni is a district in the central part of Moldova, with the administrative center at Ialoveni.
As of 1 January 2011, its population was 99,100.

History
Localities with the oldest documentary attestation of the district are: Bardar, Puhoi, Molesti, Răzeni, localities approved for the first time in the period 1443-1485. 16th-18th centuries, grow the economy (agriculture and winery), cultural (the built monasteries), as the region's population grows. In 1812, after the Russo-Turkish War (1806-1812), is the occupation of Basarabia, Russian Empire during this period (1812–1917), there is an intense russification of the native population. In 1918 after the collapse of the Russian Empire, Bessarabia united with Romania in this period (1918–1940, 1941–1944), the district is part of the Chisinau County. In 1940 after Molotov-Ribbentrop Treaty, Basarabia is occupied by the USSR. In 1991 as a result of the proclamation of Independence of Moldova, part and residence of the Chisinau County (1991–2003), and in 2003 became administrative unit of Moldova.

Geography
Ialoveni district is located in the central part of the Republic of Moldova. Neighborhood has the following district: Straseni District and Chisinau Municipality in north, east district of Anenii-Noi, districts Causeni and Cimislia in the south, west district of Hincesti. The landscape is varied, from slippery and hilly in the northwest (Central Moldavian Plateau), until smooth and plain in the east (valley of Botna River). Erosion processes vary in intensity. In structure, the soil contains considerable amounts of humus district, very rich. In the village Milestii Mici is a mine of stone, where annually about 200,000 cubic meters are extracted construction materials. Space left by the extraction of stone used in the wine industry.

Climate
The climate is temperate continental, summer is warm and long, with average July temperature +22 °C (max. +36 C), winter is mild, with average temperature in January of -4-5 °C (min. -25 c). Yearly precipitation 450–600 mm. Average wind speed 3–6 m \ s.

Fauna
Fauna typical of central Europe this mammals such as foxes, hedgehogs, deer, wild boar, ermine, ferret and more. Of birds: owl, stork, hawk, sparrow, starling, crow, egret, partridges and others.

Flora

Forests occupy 18.3% of the district and are complemented by oak, english oak, hornbeam, maple, linden, ash and others. From plants: wormwood, black, clover, knotweed, nettle, fescue and more.

Rivers
District is located in the Nistru river basin and its tributaries that cross the district: Botna (152 km) and Isnovat River (59 km). They are also certified more than a hundred water bodies, in half of them raised fish.

Administrative subdivisions
Localities: 34
Administrative center: Ialoveni
Cities: Ialoveni
Communes: 24
Villages: 32

Demographics

1 January 2012 the district population was 99,700 of which 15.7% urban and 84.3% rural population

Births (2010): 1,455 (14.7 per 1000)
Deaths (2010): 1,145 (11.6 per 1000)
Growth rate (2010): 310 (3.1 per 1000)

Ethnic groups 

Footnote: * There is an ongoing controversy regarding the ethnic identification of Moldovans and Romanians.

Religion 
Christians - 98.7%
Orthodox Christians - 98.0%
Protestant - 0.7%
Baptists - 0.3%
Seventh-day Adventists - 0.2%
Pentecostals - 0.1%
Evangelicals - 0.1%
Other - 1.1%
No Religion 0.2%

Economy
 

In the district are 19,802 registered businesses. In Ialoveni district, about 50 businesses operating in trade, three companies in transport and telecommunications, the national telephone operator working "Moldtelecom". 60% are private property, public property and the other 39% and 1% mixed ownership. Land of Ialoveni district on 1 January 2008 outside the 25 administrative units - regional first level, covers an area of 78,348 ha, including arable land - 33,431 ha (42.7%), orchards - 3727 ha (4.8% ), vineyards 7942 ha (10.2%), pastures - 7310 ha (9.4%), other land - 8700 ha (11.1%).

Sport

Ialoveni district has a well-developed sport infrastructure. All localities have sports stadiums (especially football), wrestling rooms (wrestling), the annual practice rounds of cycling, distance running and different. A young generation is given importance, modern gyms are open.

Education
The district operates 68 educational institutions, including primary schools, secondary schools, high schools - 37 (number of students - 1362), preschool - 29 (3416 children), vocational schools - 2 (563 students), teachers - 1258.

Politics
Traditional Ialoveni district, political and electoral support, right-wing parties, particularly AEI. PCRM is a continues fall percentage.

During the last three elections AEI had an increase of 47.1%

Elections

|-
!style="background-color:#E9E9E9" align=center colspan="2" valign=center|Parties and coalitions
!style="background-color:#E9E9E9" align=right|Votes
!style="background-color:#E9E9E9" align=right|%
!style="background-color:#E9E9E9" align=right|+/−
|-
| 
|align=left|Liberal Democratic Party of Moldova
|align="right"|20,465
|align="right"|42.08
|align="right"|+17.26
|-
| 
|align=left|Party of Communists of the Republic of Moldova
|align="right"|11,435
|align="right"|23.52
|align="right"|−1.50
|-
| 
|align=left|Liberal Party
|align="right"|7,953
|align="right"|16.35
|align="right"|−6.81
|-
| 
|align=left|Democratic Party of Moldova
|align="right"|5,400
|align="right"|11,10
|align="right"|-0.81
|-
| 
|align=left|Party Alliance Our Moldova
|align="right"|1,140
|align="right"|2.34
|align="right"|−9.47
|-
|bgcolor="grey"|
|align=left|Other Party
|align="right"|2,257
|align="right"|4.61
|align="right"|+1.30
|-
|align=left style="background-color:#E9E9E9" colspan="2"|Total (turnout 62.39%)
|width="30" align="right" style="background-color:#E9E9E9"|48,991
|width="30" align="right" style="background-color:#E9E9E9"|100.00
|width="30" align="right" style="background-color:#E9E9E9"|

Culture
The district operates: a museum, 23 houses of culture, 34 libraries, 57 artistic works, including 12 bands as "model".

Health
The district works: a hospital - with 132 beds, a Center of Family Physician's - with 6 offices of family doctor's, 15 health centers, 11 branch offices of family doctors.

Tourism

 Wine Collection (Golden Collection) of the Milestii Mici. It entered the Guinness Book of Records as the largest wine collection in Europe with over 1.5 million bottles of collection. The total number of bottles present in the cellars of Milestii Mici exceed 2 million. The complex of galleries (cellars) of the Milestii Mici is itself the largest in Europe, stretching nearly 250 km, of which only 120 km are used. The wines stored here are 70% red wine, white wine with only 20% and 10% of dessert wines. The most valuable present in the collection bottle of wine was produced in 1973 and worth €480.
 Fireplaces craftsmen from Ulmu and Vasieni: here visitors can get acquainted with old traditions of craftsmen in embroidery, crochet, craft.
 Valley of Botna - area folk, ethno-folk with 11 bands (songs and dances, folk customs, etc.).
 Resorts "Golden Fish" - the company Fisheries Costesti (summer cottages, hotel, restaurant, recreation area, musicians etc.).
 Suruceni Monastery (built in 19th century Moldavian architectural style);
 BardarZooClub is one of the biggest zoo's in Moldova, and unlike the traditional zoo's, here guests can actually touch and feed the animals.
 Museum of History and Ethnography of the Vasieni (here you can learn about the history of the district, represented by artifacts and handicrafts).
 If you're a fan of flowers, during April you can find 40 acres of tulip plantation in Bardarvillage, it's the biggest in Moldova.

References 

 General description of Ialoveni district
 District population per year
 Discuție:Raionul Ialoveni
 Rezultatele alegerilor din 28 noiembrie 2010 în raionul Ialoveni

 
Districts of Moldova